Maxime Boyé (born 6 March 1976) is a French former professional tennis player.

A left-handed player from Nancy, Boyé was a Petits As singles champion and won a World Youth Cup (Junior Davis Cup) title for France in 1992. He was a junior doubles finalist at the 1994 French Open, partnering Nicolas Escudé.

Boyé had a best singles ranking of 299 on the professional tour and made an ATP Tour doubles main draw appearance at the 1992 Bordeaux Open. At ATP Challenger level, he was a doubles finalist in Mumbai in 2000 and as a singles qualifier in Hull in 2001 made the semi-finals. He won one singles and five doubles titles on the ITF Futures circuit.

ATP Challenger/ITF Futures finals

Singles: 3 (1–2)

Doubles: 12 (5–7)

References

External links
 
 

1976 births
Living people
French male tennis players
Sportspeople from Nancy, France